Vezzena is a type of cow's milk cheese, produced in the area of plateau of Lavarone, Vezzena and Folgaria in the province of Trento, Italy. It is an Ark of Taste food.

See also
 List of Italian cheeses

References

Italian cheeses
Cow's-milk cheeses
Ark of Taste foods